Shadowbox is a DVD and accompanying EP by The Crüxshadows.

DVD features
 Live concert from Leipzig, Germany
 Music videos for "Dragonfly", "Edge of the World", "Cruelty" and "Winterborn (This Sacrifice)"
 Featurettes including a band interview, tour documentary and festival picture gallery
 Bonus easter eggs including the video for "Open Your Eyes" by The Dreamside featuring Rogue, live performance at Zillo, and a slideshow

CD track listing
"ForeverLast" (single version)
"Helen" (No Troy Mix / Extended version)
"ForeverLast" (Mesh Remix)
"Dragonfly" (Conjure One Remix)
"ForeverLast" (Night Version)
"...Only Sleep"
"Dragonfly" (video/radio edit)
"Edge of the World" (Skinny Puppy remix)

External links
 Crüxshadows' official site

2005 video albums
The Crüxshadows albums
Dark wave albums